Yatra  (Devanagari: यात्रा) is a 2007 Indian Hindi drama film directed by Goutam Ghose. It featured Rekha, Nana Patekar and Deepti Naval.

The film premiered at the 2006 Montréal World Film Festival.

Plot
Dasrath Joglekar (Nana Patekar), a celebrated writer, travels to New Delhi to receive the prestigious 'Sahitya Sanmaan' Literary Award. During the journey he meets a young film maker Mohan (Nakul Vaid), an ardent fan of Dasrath's writing and the encounter brings back memories from the past. Both of them travel back in time, remembering characters from Dasrath's celebrated novel 'Janaaza', reconstructing the true story of the novel's protagonist – Laajvanti (Rekha) from their own perspective. Fact and fiction merge to create a new journey.

After the gala award ceremony in New Delhi, Dasarath begins another journey in his new novel 'Bazaar', while the nostalgia of the previous one haunts him. Dasarath disappears from his hotel in New Delhi. Tension mounts in his family and associates regarding his whereabouts.

Memories from the past and passion bring him to Mehendi galli near Char Minar in Hyderabad where people flock to enjoy mujra dances. The entire area has changed. Laajvanti alias Laajobai has become Miss Lisa, presenting popular film songs numbers to entertain a new clientele. Dasarath's sudden appearance is a great surprise for Laajvanti. The character of his novel Janaaza comes alive at an unexpected juncture.

Laajvanti shows her reverence to Dasrath by singing melodies from their past. Fate accomplices another journey into the unknown. Is this fact or is it fiction, created by filmmaker Mohan for his forthcoming film called Janaaza?

Cast
Rekha - Laajvanti
Nana Patekar - Dasrath Joglekar
Deepti Naval - Smita Joglekar
Romit Raj - Yaman, Dasrath and Smita's son
Anandi Ghose - Sohini, Dasrath and Smita's daughter 
Jeeva - Pulla Reddy, Zameendar
Nakul Vaid - Mohan, a film-maker
Masood Akhtar - Salim
Bharati Devi - Dasrath's mother

Guest appearance : Parambrata Chattopadhyay, Shakuntala

Also in the supporting cast are:-
June Maliah, Imon Kalyan Ghose, Sai Charni, Chatla Sri Ramulu, Nagraja Rao, Krishna Varma, Adi Narayan Rao, Satyanarayana, Srinivas, Anand Varma, Shahidul Rahman, Gopal Kalwani, Jayachandra Reddy, Ramarao, Ganesh, Rajat Genguly, Narayanan Haralalka, Pamela Mondal, Sudeshna Chatterjee, Om, Aranya Sen, Debolina Banerjee

Music
"Aap Toh Mere Hi Khwaabon Mein Sada Aaya Kare" - Udit Narayan, Alka Yagnik Music: Khayyam
"Madhur Madhur Door Koyee Baansuri Bajaaye" - Asha Bhosle Music: Khayyam
"Mori Ankhiyaan Dhoond Rahi" - Subhra Guha Music: Goutam Ghose
"Naghma E Jaan, Saaz E Dil " -Talat Aziz Music: Khayyam
"Kabhi Aar Kabhi Paar" (Remix) - Jojo Music arranged by: Goutam Ghose
"Kabhi Aar Kabhi Paar" - Jojo Music arranged by: Goutam Ghose
"Jaam E Mohabbat Aankhon Se Hi" - Asha Bhosle Music: Khayyam
"Biya Biya" - Ustad Rashid Ali Khan Music: Goutam Ghose
"Dareja Dareja" - Subhra Guha Music: Goutam Ghose
"Garje Ghata" - Ustad Rashid Ali Khan Music: Goutam Ghose
"Jaao Ji Karo Na Jhoothi Batiyaan" - Subhra Guha Music: Goutam Ghose
"Tadpe Bin Baalam" - Subhra Guha Music: Goutam Ghose
"Panchchee Pinjare Se Ud Jaavega" - Keya Acharya Music: Goutam Ghose

Production
In January 2006, Stardust reported that Rekha and Nana Patekar were cast to play the lead roles in the film. Director Goutam Ghose said of the film: "There are autobiographical elements in the film, like my journey as a filmmaker, what I've absorbed from around myself along the way and I've used them to tell this story."

Reception
The film was received well by The Times of India, Hindustan Times, and The Indian Express, but panned by Rediff.com.

Awards
54th National Film Awards
National Film Award for Best Cinematography - Goutam Ghose

References

External links
 

2006 films
Films whose cinematographer won the Best Cinematography National Film Award
Films scored by Khayyam
2000s Hindi-language films
Films directed by Goutam Ghose